Jean de Vienne was a F70 type anti-submarine frigate of the French Marine Nationale. The French navy does not use the term "destroyer" for its ships; hence some large ships, referred to as "frigates", are registered as destroyers. She was the third French vessel named after the 14th century admiral Jean de Vienne. Her complement was 20% female.

Jean de Vienne was laid down on 26 October 1979 and launched 17 November 1981. She was accepted into the French navy on 25 May 1984.

Service history
During the 1991 Gulf War, Jean de Vienne was reported as the only French naval vessel to have been part of surface forces under the operational command and control of the United States.

In 2001, Jean de Vienne was part of the task force deployed to the Indian Ocean as part of Opération Héraklès, the initial French contribution to the War in Afghanistan. While deployed there, she was part of the escort for the aircraft carrier .

On 4 January 2009, Jean de Vienne helped to defend the Croatian tanker Donat, owned by the Tankerska plovidba from Zadar, and the Panamanian-flagged cargo ship Vulturnus, off Somalia.

In 2011, the ship deployed as part of Opération Harmattan, the French contribution to NATO's involvement in the military intervention in Libya.

The ship decommissioned in 2019.

References

External links
 Jean de Vienne at the French navy website

Frigates of France
Georges Leygues-class frigates
1981 ships
Ships built in France